The Emo Diaries is a series of twelve compilation albums released by Deep Elm Records between 1997 and 2011. The series had an open submissions policy and featured mostly acts that were unsigned at the time of the albums' releases. Deep Elm founder John Szuch claims that the original name for the series was intended to be The Indie Rock Diaries, but this was ruled out by the fact that the first volume included Jimmy Eat World and Samiam, who were both signed to major record labels. The Emo Diaries was chosen because The Emotional Diaries was too long to fit on the album cover. Despite the title, the bands featured in the series have a diversity of sounds that do not all necessarily fit into the emo style of rock music. Andy Greenwald, in his book Nothing Feels Good: Punk Rock, Teenagers, and Emo, claims that the series "stake[s] a claim for emo as more a shared aesthetic than a genre":

[T]he bands included hail from all over the world, and the musical styles range from racing punk to droopy, noodley electro. Still, the prevalence of the series—coupled with its maudlin subtitles (The Silence [in] My Heart, I Guess This Is Goodbye) and manic-depressive tattoo cover art—did much to codify the word "emo" and spread it to all corners of the underground.

Deep Elm themselves have remarked that the series' open submissions policy and diversity of bands is what made it unique: "Only the music mattered. Deep Elm has never attempted to define any musical style, as we believe any combination of songwriting, lyrics and live performance means something different to every listener." The Emo Diaries featured then-new and unreleased music by such notable acts as The Appleseed Cast, Brandtson, Further Seems Forever, Jejune, Jimmy Eat World, The Movielife, Planes Mistaken for Stars, Samiam, and Seven Storey Mountain. Ten installments were released between 1997 and 2004, after which the series was unofficially halted. According to the label:

Deep Elm cited the bastardization of the term "emo" in today's pop culture, as well as mainstream's stranglehold and subsequent commercialization of the genre, which placed the focus squarely on the aesthetic...not the music, the energy or the passion. Essentially, Deep Elm refused to play the game and closed the doors on the genre they helped to document, nurture and expose to the world.

However, in 2007 the label published an eleventh chapter in the series, entitled Taking Back What's Ours. In April 2010 Deep Elm began soliciting submissions for a twelfth installment of The Emo Diaries, which was released in January 2011 as I Love You But in the End I Will Destroy You.

Discography

References

Compilation album series
Deep Elm Records compilation albums